Petra Kvitová was the defending champion, but lost to qualifier Lucie Hradecká in the second round.

Serena Williams won the tournament, defeating World No. 1 Victoria Azarenka in straight sets, 6–1, 6–3. Azarenka lost in the final for the second year in a row.

Seeds

 Victoria Azarenka (final)
 Maria Sharapova (quarterfinals)
 Petra Kvitová (second round)
 Agnieszka Radwańska (semifinals)
 Samantha Stosur (quarterfinals)
 Caroline Wozniacki (third round)
 Marion Bartoli (first round)
 Li Na (quarterfinals)

 Serena Williams (champion)
 Vera Zvonareva (first round)
 Francesca Schiavone (first round)
 Angelique Kerber (third round)
 Ana Ivanovic (third round)
 Dominika Cibulková (first round)
 Jelena Janković (first round)
 Maria Kirilenko (second round)

Draw

Finals

Top half

Section 1

Section 2

Bottom half

Section 3

Section 4

Qualifying

Seeds

Qualifiers

Qualifying draw

First qualifier

Second qualifier

Third qualifier

Fourth qualifier

Fifth qualifier

Sixth qualifier

Seventh qualifier

Eighth qualifier

References
 Qualifying Draw
 Main Draw

Women's Singles